Jakub Słowik (born 31 August 1991) is a Polish professional footballer who plays for FC Tokyo in the J1 League.

Career
In January 2015, Słowik went on a week-long trial with English Championship side Reading F.C.
In June 2015 Słowik signed a two-year contract to play with Pogoń Szczecin.

On 22 June 2017 he signed a contract with Śląsk Wrocław.

References

External links

  
 Jakub Słowik at igol.pl
 

1991 births
Living people
Sportspeople from Nowy Sącz
Polish footballers
Polish expatriate footballers
Poland youth international footballers
Poland under-21 international footballers
Poland international footballers
Association football goalkeepers
Ekstraklasa players
I liga players
J1 League players
Sandecja Nowy Sącz players
Jagiellonia Białystok players
Warta Poznań players
Pogoń Szczecin players
Śląsk Wrocław players
Vegalta Sendai players
FC Tokyo players
Polish expatriate sportspeople in Japan
Expatriate footballers in Japan